The Neurotic Deathfest was an annual music festival dedicated to death metal. Formerly known as the Rotterdam Deathfest, it was created by Neurotic Records and has since been relocated to Tilburg.

Lineups

2015 edition (17–19 April)
The event took place at the 013 complex and lasted three days.

It was announced as the final edition.

Bloodbath
Entombed A.D.
Immolation
Morgoth
Obituary

2014 edition (2–4 May)
The event took place at the 013 complex and lasted three days.

Dark Angel
Suffocation
Terrorizer

2013 edition (3–5 May)
The event took place at the 013 complex and lasted three days.

Antropomorphia
Bodyfarm
Buried
Carcass
Cattle Decapitation
Centurian
Cliteater
Cock and Ball Torture
Crepitation
Cryptopsy
Death to All
Decapitated
Decrepit Birth
Defeated Sanity
Devourment
Enemy Reign
Exhumed
Haemorrhage
Hammercult
Immolation
Incantation
Iniquity
Internal Suffering
The Last Shot of War
Magrudergrind
Malignant Tumour
The Monolith Deathcult
Morbid Saint
Necrophagia
Obscura
Pig Destroyer
Possessed
Putridity
Re-armed
Rectal Smegma
Repulsion
Strong Intention
Tribulation
Unfathomable Ruination
Unleashed
Vader
Vallenfyre
Wormed

2012 edition (2–4 March)
The event took place at the 013 complex and lasted three days.

Aborted
Abysmal Torment
Acheron
Anaal Nathrakh
Asphyx
Begging for Incest
Beneath the Massacre
Behemoth
Benighted
Betraying the Martyrs
Blasphemer
Blood Red Throne
Cannibal Corpse
Carceri
Carnifex
Cattle Decapitation
Centurian
Cerebral Bore
Coldworker
Debauchery
Decapitated
Dictated
Dyscarnate
Fleshgod Apocalypse
Gorguts
Gorod
Internal Bleeding
Kenos
Legion of the Damned
Leng Tch'e
Misery Index
Molotov Solution
Morgoth
Napalm Death
Nexus Inferis
Origin
Prostitute Disfigurement
Psycroptic
Putrid Pile
Sephirah
Sonne Adam
Sublime Cadaveric Decomposition
Suffering Quota
Suffocation
Suicidal Angels
Uncleansed
Vomitory
Within the Ruins

2011 edition (29–30 April)

The event took place at the 013 complex and, for the first time, at the Midi Theatre.

Aeon
AnthropomorphiA
Atheist
At the Gates
Autopsy
Beheaded
Beneath
Beneath the Massacre
Benighted
Birdflesh
Blood Red Throne
carnivore Diprosopus
Centurian
Cerebral Bore
Cripple Bastards
Decapitated
Defiled
Exhumed
Flayed Disciple
Fleshrot
Grave
Hail of Bullets
Hate Eternal
Incantation
Kraanium
Logic of Denial
Macabre
Magrudergrind
Master
Misery Index
Necrophagia
Obituary
Obscura
Pathology
Prostitute Disfigurement
Rompeprop
Septycal Gorge
Soreption
Southwicvked
Visceral Trail
Vulvectomy
Wormed

2010 edition (30 April-1 May)

Aborted
Abysmal Torment
Annotations of an Autopsy
As You Drown
Beheaded
Belphegor
Beneath the Massacre
Benediction
Benighted
Bolt Thrower
Burning Skies
Carcass
Cerebral Bore
Defeated Sanity
Dew-Scented
Dr. Doom
Dying Fetus
Enemy Reign
Gorod
Hour of Penance
Human Mincer
Immolation
Insidious Decrepancy
Insision
Lock Up
Malignancy
Man Must Die
Murder Therapy
Napalm Death
Origin
Pestilence
Putrid Pile
Resistance
Revocation
Rise and Fall
Rotten Sound
Rotting Christ
Septycal Gorge
Six Feet Under
The End Of All Reason
Viral Load

2009 edition (29–30 May)

Aborted
Behemoth
Brutal Truth
Deadborn
Demonical
Despondency
Engine of Doom
Entombed
FaceBreaker
Flesh Made Sin
Fleshrot
Gadget
God Dethroned
Hail of Bullets
Human Mincer
Illdisposed
Inevitable End
Inhume
Inveracity
Misery Index
Moker
Mumakil
The New Dominion
Nox
Obscura
Rotten Sound
Salt the Wound
Severe Torture
Torture Killer
A Trail of Horror
Unleashed

2008 edition (30–31 May)

For the first time the event took place at the 013 complex in Tilburg.

Aborted
Asphyx
Benighted
Behemoth
Blood Red Throne
Brutus
Cephalic Carnage
Coldworker
Condemned
Cryptopsy
Dead Beyond Buried
Dead Infection
Decrepit Birth
Desecration
Dying Fetus
Exmortem
Extreme Noise Terror
Fleshgod Apocalypse
Fleshless
Grind Inc.
Hate
Hate Eternal
Hour of Penance
Houwitser
Impaled
Incarnated
Lay Down Rotten
Napalm Death
Natron
Origin
Severe Torture
Sickening Horror
Suffocation
Unmerciful
Warbringer

2007 edition (11–12 May)

Cephalic Carnage
Dawn of Azazel
Defeated Sanity
Degrade
Despise
Grave
Gutted
Hour of Penance
Immolation
Infected Disarray
Krisiun
Kronos
Leng Tch'e
Nailed
Prostitute Disfigurement
Rompeprop
Septycal Gorge
Severe Torture
Suffocate Bastard
Toxocara
Viral Load
Visceral Bleeding
Vital Remains

2006 edition (13 May)

Billed as the Neurotic Deathfest, the event took place at the Dynamo, Eindhoven.

Anata
Arsebreed
Avulsed
Disavowed
Emeth
Godless Truth
Gorerotted
Infected Malignity
Insidious Decrepancy
Mental Horror
Prostitute Disfigurement
Psycroptic
Sanatorium
Sarpanitum
Vomit the Soul

2005 edition (13–14 May)

Billed as Rotterdam Deathfest, the event took place at the Baroeg club.

Aborted
Corpus Mortale
Defeated Sanity
Despondency
Godless Truth
Gorgasm
Inveracity
Massmurder
Putrefied
Severe Torture
Visceral Bleeding
Vomit Remnants
Wormed

2004 edition (8 May)

Billed as Rotterdam Deathfest, the event took place at the Baroeg club.

 Cardinal
 Despondency
 Exmortem
 Gorerotted
 NOX
 Prostitute Disfigurement
 Severe Torture
 Spawn of Possession

External links
 https://web.archive.org/web/20161107234739/http://www.neuroticdeathfest.com/

Heavy metal festivals in the Netherlands